Kent South is a provincial electoral district for the Legislative Assembly of New Brunswick, Canada.

It was originally created in 1973 with the southern third of Kent County, centred primarily around the town of Bouctouche. It was largely unchanged in the 1994 redistribution. In 2006 it lost the Bouctouche area to Kent.  In the 2013 redistribution its northern half was merged with the southern half of Kent, causing it to regain Bouctouche and add several rural areas to its north, but lose much the extreme southern part of Kent County around Cocagne.

Members of the Legislative Assembly

Election results

|-

References

External links 
Website of the Legislative Assembly of New Brunswick
Map of riding as of 2018

New Brunswick provincial electoral districts